Aaron Wexler (born 1974) is an American artist based in New York City.

Wexler was born in Philadelphia.  He makes layered acrylic and paper collages on surfaces of panel and paper.  His work features a mixture of figurative and abstract imagery, and real and imagined spaces.

He received his MFA in painting and drawing from The School of The Art Institute of Chicago in 1999.

Selected exhibitions
1999
Post MFA, Peter Miller Gallery, Chicago
2000
Minimal Provocations, Betty Rymer Gallery, Chicago,
Flat Files, Bellwether Gallery, Brooklyn
2001
FFWD Miami, Contemporary Art Fair, Miami
The Willow House, Ukrainian Institute of Modern Art, Chicago
2002
Gecenkondu, Apexart, New York
2003
Team Work, Vox Populi Gallery, Philadelphia
2004
Aaron Wexler & Colin Keefe, PS122 Gallery, New York
2005
No Apology For Breathing, Jack The Pelican Presents, Brooklyn
2006
The New Collage, Pavel Zoubok Gallery, New York
181st Annual Invitational Exhibition of Contemporary Art, The National Academy Museum, New York
2008
One In The Other Gallery, London
Josee Bienveunu Gallery, New York

References

External links
Aaron Wexler’s blog
Aaron Wexler on ArtFacts.net
Artist’s official site
Aaron Wexler on Re-Title.com
Further information from the Saatchi Gallery

Living people
1974 births
20th-century American artists
21st-century American artists
20th-century American painters
21st-century American painters